Jack Cooper (29 December 1922 – 29 September 2003) was an Australian rules footballer who played with Carlton in the Victorian Football League (VFL).

Notes

External links 

Jack Cooper's profile at Blueseum
WAFL statistics

1922 births
Carlton Football Club players
Subiaco Football Club players
Australian rules footballers from Western Australia
2003 deaths